In biology CFU-Mast is a colony forming unit. It gives rise to mast cells.

References 

Colony forming units
Blood cells